Mesquita may refer to:

People
 Mesquita (surname)
 Mesquita Machado, Portuguese politician

Places in Brazil
 Mesquita, Minas Gerais, a municipality in Minas Gerais
 Mesquita, Rio de Janeiro, a municipality in Rio de Janeiro

Sports
 Mesquita Futebol Clube, a football club from Mesquita, Rio de Janeiro